Season sixteen of Dancing with the Stars premiered on March 18, 2013, on the ABC network.

Country music singer Kellie Pickler and Derek Hough were crowned the champions, while Disney Channel star Zendaya and  finished in second place, and Baltimore Ravens wide receiver Jacoby Jones and Karina Smirnoff finished third.

Cast

Couples
The cast of eleven and their professional partners was announced on February 26, 2013 on Good Morning America, with Jacoby Jones' participation confirmed two days earlier on February 24 during a network promo for the series airing during the 85th Oscars as a tease for the GMA announcement. This season saw its youngest contestant to date—16-year-old Zendaya (previously being  Shawn Johnson from season 8 at 17). Although in Season 20, the record was taken from Zendaya by Willow Shields who competed when she was 14. Two weeks following the cast announcement, Sean Lowe as revealed on GMA as the 12th contestant this season partnering with Peta Murgatroyd. The following professionals who did not return for season 16 include Chelsie Hightower, Louis van Amstel, Anna Trebunskaya, and Maksim Chmerkovskiy.  Lindsay Arnold, a contestant from season nine of So You Think You Can Dance was introduced as a new professional along with Troupe member Sharna Burgess. Gleb Savchenko, who recently participated as a professional on season twelve of the Australian version, was also announced as a new professional. The dance troupe is made up of last season's members Oksana Dmytrenko, Henry Byalikov, Emma Slater and Sasha Farber, along with new members Witney Carson and Julian Tocker.

Host and judges
Tom Bergeron and Brooke Burke Charvet returned as co-hosts, while Carrie Ann Inaba, Len Goodman, and Bruno Tonioli returned as judges. Scoring returned to using traditional whole numbers, instead of using the fractional scores introduced previous season. The Harold Wheeler orchestra and singers also returned to provide the music throughout the season.

Scoring charts

Notes

 : This was the lowest score of the week.
 : This was the highest score of the week.
 :  This couple finished in first place.
 :  This couple finished in second place.
 :  This couple finished in third place.
 :  This couple withdrew from the competition.
 :  This couple was in the bottom two, but was not eliminated.
 :  This couple was eliminated.

Highest and lowest scoring performances 
The highest and lowest performances in each dance according to the judges' 30-point scale are as follows.

Couples' highest and lowest scoring dances
Scores are based upon a potential 30-point maximum.

Weekly scores
Individual judges' scores in the charts below (given in parentheses) are listed in this order from left to right: Carrie Ann Inaba, Len Goodman, Bruno Tonioli.

Week 1: First Dances
Couples are listed in the order they performed.

Week 2: First Elimination
Couples are listed in the order they performed.

At the results show of this week, it was announced that Dorothy Hamill would be withdrawing from the show due to an injury she had suffered from during training prior to this week.

Week 3: Prom Night
All couples participated in a team freestyle, where Jacoby & Karina and Zendaya & Val each received two bonus points, plus one unlearned dance. Couples are listed in the order they performed.

Week 4: Best Year of My Life Night
Couples performed one unlearned dance celebrating the most memorable year of their lives. Each celebrity included a brief solo during their routines. Kyle Jacobs, Kellie Pickler's husband, performed his own song that he wrote for Kellie. Couples are listed in the order they performed.

Week 5: Len's Side-by-Side Challenge
Each couple had to select two other professionals that had either been eliminated, featured in previous seasons, or participated in the troupe; and then performed simultaneously with those professional dancers. Couples are listed in the order they performed.

Week 6: Stevie Wonder Night
Each couple danced to a song by Stevie Wonder. Each couple also performed a team dance picked by the highest scoring couples: Zendaya & Val (Team Paso doble) and Kellie & Derek (Team Samba). Couples are listed in the order they performed.

Week 7: Latin Night
Each couple danced to a Latin hit. After having danced, the top scoring couple was saved from elimination that week. The remaining six couples then took part in a dance-off, where they competed against another couple doing the cha-cha-cha, jive, or rumba. For each dance-off, the judges chose a winning couple and added three bonus points to their scores. Couples are listed in the order they performed.

Week 8: Trio Night
Each couple performed one unlearned ballroom dance as well as a trio dance. Each couple chose one professional who was either previously eliminated or participated in the dance troupe to perform with them.Couples are listed in the order they performed.

Week 9: Semifinals
Each couple performed two unlearned dances, one of which was chosen by the viewers through Twitter. Couples are listed in the order they performed.

Week 10: Finals
On night one, each couple performed a dance chosen by one of the judges, a cha-cha-cha relay, and a supersized freestyle. On night two, one of the four couples was eliminated, and the remaining three couples then performed an instant dance of a style that they had already learned with music given to them just minutes before. Couples are listed in the order they performed. 

Night 1

Night 2

Dance chart 
The celebrities and professional partners danced one of these routines for each corresponding week:
 Week 1 (First Dances): One unlearned dance
 Week 2 (First Elimination): One unlearned dance 
 Week 3 (Prom Night): Group dance & one unlearned dance 
 Week 4 (Best Year of My Life Night): One unlearned dance 
 Week 5 (Len's Side-By-Side Challenge): One unlearned dance 
 Week 6 (Stevie Wonder Night): One unlearned dance & team dances 
 Week 7 (Latin Night): One unlearned dance & dance-offs 
 Week 8 (Trio Night): One unlearned dance & trio dance 
 Week 9 (Semifinals): One unlearned dance & Twitter-chosen dance 
 Week 10 (Finals, Night 1): Judge's choice, cha-cha-cha relay & freestyle
 Week 10 (Finals, Night 2): Instant dance

Notes

 :  This was the highest scoring dance of the week.
 :  This was the lowest scoring dance of the week.
 :  This couple gained bonus points for winning this dance-off.
 :  This couple gained no bonus points for losing this dance-off.
 :  This couple earned immunity and did not have to compete in the dance-off.
 :  This couple danced, but received no scores.

Ratings

References

External links 

Dancing with the Stars (American TV series)
2013 American television seasons